The Hidden World is a 1958 American science documentary film produced by Robert Snyder. It was nominated for an Academy Award for Best Documentary Feature.

See also
 List of American films of 1958

References

External links

1958 films
1958 documentary films
American documentary films
Documentary films about nature
1950s English-language films
1950s American films